Carolina Gómez Correa (born 26 February 1974) is a Colombian actress, presenter and model, who held the title of Miss Colombia 1993 and placed 1st Runner-Up at Miss Universe 1994.

Pageantry

Señorita Colombia
She won the Miss Colombia title in 1993 representing Bogotá D. C. She was crowned at the age of 18 years old, having graduated from Colegio Nueva Granada.

Miss Universe
She entered the Miss Universe 1994 pageant where she placed 1st Runner-up; Carolina Gómez was the third Colombian to win 1st Runner-up in a row at a Miss Universe competition, after Paola Turbay in 1992 and Paula Andrea Betancur in 1993.

Career
After her reign, Gómez went into modeling, achieving success on runways in Italy and Miami. She was the host of "Stars", a television show where many artists and celebrities were interviewed; afterwards, she was the successor to Jaime Garzón in the show "Locos Videos". She was also a TV Producer, as such, she was co-chair of Vista Productions Inc. In 2004, she made her acting debut in a soap opera, "El Auténtico Rodrigo Leal", telecasted by Caracol Channel (in Colombia), where she had the role of the host of a TV Reality Program with the Argentinian actor Martín Karpan. Her acting in this role received excellent reviews, which led to her role as protagonist in "La Viuda de la Mafía", another soap opera which aired in 2006 in RCN Channel (another Colombian Channel). Between 2007 and 2010 she worked in different TV series such as Mujeres Asesinas, Sin Retorno, Tiempo Final and Karabudjan. The latter was a 6-hour miniseries for Antena 3 in Spain. Currently, she played Alicia Duran in A corazón abierto, the Colombian adaptation of Grey's Anatomy.

She has also starred in several films, including director Felipe Martínez Amador's feature film Bluff, with Catalina Aristizábal, Víctor Mallarino, and Luis Eduardo Arango, amongst others. The film, which premiered in March 2007, had very good reviews and very high box office revenues in Colombia. In 2010, she traveled to Los Angeles to co-star in the film The Chosen One along with comedian Rob Schneider (who also wrote and directed the movie).

Filmography

Films 
#RealityHigh' (2017)Adelaida (2014)La Lectora (2012)Greetings to the Devil (2011)The Chosen One (2010)Federal (2010)El Paseo (2010)Bluff (2007)Martinis al atardecer (2004)

 Television Ventino: El precio de la gloria (2023)Her Mother's Killer (2020)El Barón (2019)Seal Team (2018)Sangre de mi tierra (2017-2018)Lucifer (2016)Bloque de búsqueda (2016)Los hombres también lloran (2014)Mentiras perfectas (2013)La Teacher de Ingles (2011)A corazón abierto (2010)Karabudjan (2010)Amas de casa desesperadas (Season 2) (2010)Tiempo final (2009)Sin retorno (2008) (2007)Marido a Sueldo (2007)La viuda de la mafia (2004)El auténtico Rodrigo Leal (2003)Decisiones''

References

External links
 

1974 births
21st-century Colombian actresses
Actresses from Cali
Colombian emigrants to the United States
Colombian film actresses
Colombian telenovela actresses
Colombian television actresses
Living people
Miss Colombia winners
Miss Universe 1994 contestants
People from Cali